Jorge Bedoya (24 November 1929 – 30 November 2001) was an Argentine equestrian. He competed in two events at the 1968 Summer Olympics.

References

1929 births
2001 deaths
Argentine male equestrians
Olympic equestrians of Argentina
Equestrians at the 1968 Summer Olympics
Sportspeople from Buenos Aires